Same-sex marriage in New Hampshire has been legal since January 1, 2010, based on legislation signed into law by Governor John Lynch on June 3, 2009. The law provided that civil unions, which the state had established on January 1, 2008, would be converted to marriages on January 1, 2011, unless dissolved, annulled, or converted to marriage before that date. New Hampshire became the fifth U.S. state to legalize same-sex marriage, and the fourth in New England.

Civil unions
Following the first same-sex marriages in Massachusetts in May 2004, New Hampshire established a 14-member commission to consider the question of civil recognition of same-sex relationships. The group, composed of legislators, politicians, and activists, reported its findings in November 2005. By a 7–4 vote, it recommended modifying the Constitution of New Hampshire to restrict marriage to heterosexual unions, reinforcing the state's statutory definition of marriage to prevent the judiciary from finding a constitutional requirement that same-sex couples be allowed to wed. Their report opposed as well the idea of civil unions like those recognized in Vermont in July 2000. The commission proposed instead certificates that would guarantee certain rights like hospital visitation, but no financial benefits. The certificates would be available to siblings, parents, and children as well. The commission members who dissented said it spent too much time hearing attacks on the morality of homosexuality. The chairman, Tony Soltani, a Republican member of the state House of Representatives, said; "If we redefined marriage, we'd be tarred and feathered, but if we give them some rights, it will be accepted." He said homosexuality could not be compared to race, because it is an "acquired behavior" or a "combination of both nature and nurture." He added: "I know it's not a long-term solution, but it is something a child can point to and say, my representatives say I'm OK, and I'm not a freak."

Democrats became the majority party in the New Hampshire General Court in the 2006 general election. Both Democratic and Republican legislators proposed legislation to grant same-sex couples greater civil rights. The proposals ranged from allowing a couple to enter into a "contractual cohabitation", a "civil union", a "spousal union", or a same-sex marriage. Governor John Lynch opposed same-sex marriage, but indicated that he was receptive to discussing civil unions as a means of granting certain rights to same-sex couples.

In early 2007, the General Court briefly considered a bill authorizing same-sex marriage until Democratic leaders assigned it to a study committee. On April 4, 2007, by a vote of 243 to 129, the New Hampshire House passed a civil union bill that gave partners in same-sex civil unions the same "rights, responsibilities and obligations" as heterosexual married couples. Lynch took no public position until April 19, when he said that he would sign legislation establishing civil unions for same-sex couples because he believed "it is a matter of conscience, fairness and preventing discrimination." On April 26, 2007, the New Hampshire Senate approved the civil union bill 14–10 on a party line vote. On May 31, 2007, Governor Lynch signed the civil union bill into law, making New Hampshire "the first state to embrace same-sex unions without a court order or the threat of one." The law took effect on January 1, 2008. Licenses for civil unions became available on December 10, 2007, allowing civil unions to be formalized in the very early hours of January 1, 2008. Deputy Secretary of State David Scanlan said, "As far as we're concerned, everything is on schedule."

The first civil unions were formed throughout New Hampshire just after midnight on January 1, 2008. The largest gathering occurred on the steps of the State House in Concord. An estimated 40 couples participated as 200-300 friends, family and onlookers observed. The event drew one protester who "quietly handed out a statement calling all sex outside of heterosexual marriage a sin."

Under the New Hampshire civil union law, same-sex civil unions or marriages conducted in other jurisdictions were recognized as civil unions in New Hampshire. Representative Maureen Mooney introduced legislation to repeal that portion of the civil union law, but her proposal was deemed inexpedient to legislate, a legislative procedure equivalent to not passing the bill out of committee.

Rights and limitations
Though the civil union law intended to provide "all the rights and ... obligations and responsibilities provided for in state law that apply to parties who are joined together," they actually entailed a more limited set of benefits and limitations. The benefits included:
 Access to medical care information and decision making;
 Access to proceedings and information related to partner's death, and ability to make funeral arrangements;
 Right to be placed in the same room in a nursing home;
 Health care coverage under state-regulated family plans;
 State pension benefits;
 Inheritance without a will;
 Ability to transfer property between partners without paying state taxes;
 Ability to change names by showing civil union certificate to government agencies, banks, etc. and simply stating a name preference;
 Pay or receive alimony and/or child support ordered by a court in a divorce;
 Ability to adopt as a stepparent.

The limitations associated with civil unions included:
 Legal status only recognized in certain states;
 Unclear divorce proceedings should one or both partners move out-of-state;
 If partner's death occurs out-of-state, unclear whether surviving partner may obtain death certificate and claim body;
 Employers governed by federal laws are allowed to provide health and other benefits only to heterosexual couples on a tax-free basis, whereas same-sex couples must pay income taxes on the value of such benefits;
 Partners are treated as unmarried adults under more than 1,100 federal laws;
 May jeopardize a couple's ability to adopt overseas;
 Federal privacy laws can prohibit access to some medical care information without durable power of attorney.

Same-sex marriage
In 1987, New Hampshire modified its statutes to make same-sex marriages invalid.

On March 18, 2009, the New Hampshire House of Representatives Judiciary Committee sent a same-sex marriage bill, HB 436, to the floor of the House without a recommendation following a tied 10–10 vote. On March 26, the House voted 182–183, but after a motion to reconsider the first vote, the measure passed 186–179. On April 23, the New Hampshire Senate Judiciary Committee by a vote of 3–2 recommended that the full Senate defeat the bill, but a week later the Senate approved an amended version of the bill 13–11. The amended bill passed the House on May 6, 2009. Governor John Lynch had yet to take a position on the legislation, and had five days to exercise his veto. The bill recognized out-of-state civil unions as marriages. Couples who had entered into civil unions would be able to apply for a marriage license; however, if they did not apply for a marriage certificate their civil unions would automatically be converted to marriages on January 1, 2011.

On May 14, Lynch, though personally opposed to same-sex marriages, said he would sign the bill provided it contained increased protections for churches against lawsuits if they refuse to marry same-sex couples. Legislative leaders indicated on the same day that they would allow the changes. On May 20, 2009, the Senate passed the changes 14–10 along party lines, but the House unexpectedly failed to agree later in the day by a vote of 188–186. Opponents in that body tried to kill the bill, but failed 173 to 202. The House then voted 207–168 to ask the Senate to negotiate a compromise. On May 29, the two chambers reached a compromise with some minor changes that Lynch approved. The revised legislation was approved 14–10 by the Senate and 198–176 by the House on June 3 and signed by Governor Lynch shortly thereafter. Lynch was the second governor in the United States to sign a bill to legalize same-sex marriage, the first being John Baldacci of Maine. The definition of marriage in New Hampshire became:

Transition from civil unions to marriage
From January 1, 2010, no new civil unions are established in the state. Parties to a valid civil union established before that date were able to have their marriages solemnized, provided they met the legal requirements of the state marriage laws. Additionally, such persons in civil unions established before January 1, 2010 were able to record their civil unions with the town or city clerk who recorded the civil union and receive a marriage license, with no additional fee or solemnization required. A civil union entered into before January 1, 2010, that had not been dissolved, annulled, or transformed into a marriage, was automatically converted to a marriage on January 1, 2011.

Repeal efforts
In 2010, the General Court considered two repeal proposals, a bill to repeal both the same-sex marriage law and the state's 2007 civil union law and a constitutional amendment to ban same-sex marriage. The House defeated both of them on February 17, 2010.

On October 25, 2011, the House Judiciary Committee voted 11–6 for a bill repealing same-sex marriage and establishing civil unions far more limited than the state's earlier civil unions. The new civil unions would not be covered by the state's anti-discrimination law and no one would be required to recognize them as the equivalent of opposite-sex marriages. The bill's effect on same-sex marriages already performed in the state was disputed. In January 2012, Representative David Bates, the principal sponsor of the legislation, said the bill would be the first legislative repeal of same-sex marriage in the U.S., but Governor John Lynch announced he would veto any repeal of the state's same-sex marriage statute. New Hampshire Republicans were generally identified with the repeal effort and they controlled the 400-member House by a 3–1 margin. The Nashua Telegraph termed the failure of the repeal effort in March 2012 "a shocking setback". The House defeated a series of attempts to modify the bill to attract moderate support by providing same-sex couples with an alternative to marriage. Bates' own amendment to delay the bill's effective date until March 31 so a non-binding referendum on the issue of same-sex marriage could be held in November failed on a vote of 188–162, with 96 of the chamber's 293 Republicans voting against the referendum. Opposing the referendum, Representative Shawn Jasper, then the House Deputy Majority Leader, said: "We are the most representative body in the country, if not the world. If we feel the need to go to our constituents and ask them a question, we are clearly in trouble." On March 21, 2012, the House defeated the bill on a vote of 211 to 116.
 
Democrat Maggie Hassan, a supporter of same-sex marriage, ran against the General Court's record and won election as governor in November 2012, and Democrats took control of the House.

Later legislation
For several years following the legalization of same-sex marriage in New Hampshire, the state statutes invalidated any marriage contracted in New Hampshire by non-residents if their intended state of residence would not recognize the validity of the marriage if contracted within its own jurisdiction. On July 10, 2014, Governor Hassan signed legislation designed to clarify the status of same-sex marriages. It established that same-sex marriages from other jurisdictions are recognized by New Hampshire as valid from the date they were contracted, even if they pre-dated New Hampshire's recognition of same-sex marriage; that New Hampshire recognizes the same-sex marriages of non-residents whether or not their home jurisdiction recognizes the marriage; and allows those in civil unions in other jurisdictions to marry in New Hampshire without first dissolving their civil union.

In May 2018, the General Court passed legislation establishing a uniform, minimum marriageable age at 16. The bill allows same-sex partners to marry from the age of 16; previously same-sex couples could only marry from the age of 18, while heterosexual partners could marry at 13 for women and 14 for men. On June 18, 2018, Governor Chris Sununu signed the bill into law, and it went into effect on January 1, 2019.

Economic impact
A University of California, Los Angeles study from March 2009 estimated the impact of allowing same-sex couples to marry on New Hampshire's state budget. The study concluded that allowing same-sex couples to marry, as opposed to the old civil union scheme, would result in a net gain of approximately $500,000 each year for the state. This net impact would be the result of savings in expenditures on state means-tested public benefits programs and an increase in meals and room tax revenues from increased wedding-related tourism.

Demographics and marriage statistics
Data from the 2000 U.S. census showed that 2,703 same-sex couples were living in New Hampshire. By 2005, this had increased to 5,578 couples, likely attributed to same-sex couples' growing willingness to disclose their partnerships on government surveys. Same-sex couples lived in all counties of the state, and constituted 0.9% of coupled households and 0.6% of all households in the state. Most couples lived in Hillsborough, Rockingham and Merrimack counties, but the counties with the highest percentage of same-sex couples were Cheshire (0.63% of all county households) and Belknap (0.61%). Same-sex partners in New Hampshire were on average younger than opposite-sex partners, and more likely to be employed. However, the average and median household incomes of same-sex couples were lower than different-sex couples, and same-sex couples were also far less likely to own a home than opposite-sex partners. 19% of same-sex couples in New Hampshire were raising children under the age of 18, with an estimated 1,614 children living in households headed by same-sex couples in 2005.

At the end of 2008, after the civil union law had been in effect for one year, approximately 600 civil union licenses had been issued by the state, while approximately 8,700 marriage licenses were issued by the state during the same period.

By spring 2012, 1,900 same-sex couples had married in New Hampshire. 2,329 same-sex couples had married in the state by June 2013.

Public opinion
{| class="wikitable"
|+style="font-size:100%" | Public opinion for same-sex marriage in New Hampshire
|-
! style="width:190px;"| Poll source
! style="width:200px;"| Date(s)administered
! class=small | Samplesize
! Margin oferror
! style="width:100px;"| % support
! style="width:100px;"| % opposition
! style="width:40px;"| % no opinion
|-
| Public Religion Research Institute
| align=center| March 8–November 9, 2021
| align=center| ?
| align=center| ?
|  align=center| 76%
| align=center| 23%
| align=center| 1%
|-
| Public Religion Research Institute
| align=center| January 7–December 20, 2020
| align=center| 238 random telephoneinterviewees
| align=center| ?
|  align=center| 82%
| align=center| 18%
| align=center| <0.5%
|-
| Public Religion Research Institute
| align=center| April 5–December 23, 2017
| align=center| 311 random telephoneinterviewees
| align=center| ?
|  align=center| 73%
| align=center| 22%
| align=center| 5%
|-
| Public Religion Research Institute
| align=center| May 18, 2016–January 10, 2017
| align=center| 432 random telephoneinterviewees
| align=center| ?
|  align=center| 70%
| align=center| 19%
| align=center| 9%
|-
| Public Religion Research Institute
| align=center| April 29, 2015–January 7, 2016
| align=center| 369 random telephoneinterviewees
| align=center| ?
|  align=center| 73%
| align=center| 19%
| align=center| 8%
|-
| Bloomberg Politics/Saint Anselm New Hampshire Poll
| align=center| May 2–May 6, 2015
| align=center| 952 likely voters
| align=center| ?
|  align=center| 67%
| align=center| 24%
| align=center| 10%
|-
| Public Religion Research Institute
| align=center| April 2, 2014–January 4, 2015
| align=center| 219 random telephoneinterviewees
| align=center| ?
|  align=center| 75%
| align=center| 19%
| align=center| 5%
|-
| New York Times/CBS News/YouGov
| align=center| September 20–October 1, 2014
| align=center| 1260 likely voters
| align=center| ± 3%
|  align=center| 63%
| align=center| 24%
| align=center| 13%
|-
| Public Policy Polling
| align=center| January 9–12, 2014
| align=center| 1,354 voters
| align=center| ± 2.7%
|  align=center| 60%
| align=center| 29%
| align=center| 11%
|-
| Public Policy Polling
| align=center| September 13–16, 2013
| align=center| 1,038 voters
| align=center| ± 3%
|  align=center| 55%
| align=center| 32%
| align=center| 13%
|-
| Nelson A. Rockefeller Center
| align=center| April 22–25, 2013
| align=center| 433 registered voters 
| align=center| ± 4.7%
|  align=center| 55.4%
| align=center| 29.6%
| align=center| 15%
|-
| Public Policy Polling
| align=center| May 10–13, 2012
| align=center| 1,163 voters
| align=center| ± 2.9%
|  align=center| 57%
| align=center| 35%
| align=center| 8%
|-
| Nelson A. Rockefeller Center
| align=center| April 2–5, 2012
| align=center| 403 registered voters 
| align=center| ± 4.9%
|  align=center| 55.1%
| align=center| 30.9%
| align=center| 14%
|-
| Public Policy Polling
| align=center| June 30–July 5, 2011
| align=center| 622 voters
| align=center| ± 3.8%
|  align=center| 51%
| align=center| 38%
| align=center| 11%
|-
| Nelson A. Rockefeller Center
| align=center| April 11–14, 2011
| align=center| 426 registered voters 
| align=center| ± 4.8%
| align=center| 41.5%
|  align=center| 42.2%
| align=center| 16.3%
|-
| Greenberg Quinlan Rosner Research
| align=center| January 30–February 3, 2011
| align=center| 622 voters
| align=center| ± 3.9%
|  align=center| 59%
| align=center| 34%
| align=center| 7%
|-
| University of New Hampshire Survey Center/New Hampshire Freedom to Marry
| align=center| April 13–22, 2009
| align=center| 491 voters
| align=center| ± ?%
|  align=center| 55%
| align=center| 39%
| align=center| 6%
|-
| University of New Hampshire Survey Center 
| align=center| February 2004
| align=center| ?
| align=center| ?
|  align=center| 55%
| align=center| ?
| align=center| ?
|-
| University of New Hampshire Survey Center 
| align=center| May 2003
| align=center| ?
| align=center| ?
|  align=center| 54%
| align=center| ?
| align=center| ?
|-

A University of New Hampshire Survey Center poll conducted in February 2004 found that 64% of New Hampshire residents opposed a federal constitutional amendment that would ban same-sex marriage. However, a later survey in February 2005 by Research 2000 for the Concord Monitor showed that 51% of likely voters in the state supported such a federal constitutional amendment.

A University of New Hampshire Survey Center poll taken between January 27 and February 6, 2011 found that 62% of New Hampshire residents opposed the new Republican-dominated General Court's efforts to repeal the 2009 law legalizing same-sex marriage, with only 29% in favor of repeal. In addition, 51% voiced strong opposition to repeal. A poll conducted between January 30 and February 3, 2011 by Greenberg Quinlan Rosner Research showed that 63% of residents opposed the bill repealing same-sex marriage, while 29% supported it. Another University of New Hampshire Survey Center poll, conducted between September 26 and October 2, 2011, showed that 62% of state residents were against repealing same-sex marriage, while 27% were in favor.

A Voter Consumer Research poll conducted on December 11–15, 2011 found that 64% of New Hampshire voters opposed repealing same-sex marriage, while 31% supported it. A University of New Hampshire Survey Center poll conducted between January 25 and February 2, 2012 found that 59% of New Hampshire voters were against repealing same-sex marriage, while 32% were in favor. A further University of New Hampshire Survey Center poll, conducted between August 1 and 12, 2012, found that 61% of New Hampshire voters were against repealing same-sex marriage, while 28% supported it.

A July 2011 Public Policy Polling survey found that 80% of respondents supported legal recognition for same-sex couples, with 45% supporting same-sex marriage and 35% supporting civil unions, while only 19% thought that there should be no legal recognition and 1% were not sure. A May 2012 survey by the same polling organization found that 85% of respondents supported legal recognition for same-sex couples, with 54% supporting same-sex marriage and 31% supporting civil unions, while only 13% thought that there should be no legal recognition and 2% were not sure.

See also

 LGBT rights in New Hampshire
 Gene Robinson
 Same-sex marriage in the United States

References

LGBT in New Hampshire
New Hampshire law
New Hampshire
2010 in LGBT history
2010 in New Hampshire